Hemicoelus fulvicornis is a species of beetle in the family Ptinidae. It is native to Europe, its distribution extending into the Caucasus and Asia Minor.

Beetles in this family live and breed in wood. This species is associated with trees such as hornbeams, chestnuts, hazels, beeches, oaks, and species of Populus and Prunus.

References

External links
Hemicoelus fulvicornis. Fauna Europaea.

Ptinidae
Beetles described in 1837